Microbacterium gubbeenense is a Gram-positive, facultatively anaerobic, non-spore-forming and non-motile bacterium from the genus Microbacterium which has been isolated from the surface of a smear-ripened cheese in Ireland.

References

Further reading

External links
Type strain of Microbacterium gubbeenense at BacDive -  the Bacterial Diversity Metadatabase	

Bacteria described in 2001
gubbeenense